Kawina is an extinct genus of trilobite in the order Phacopida. It contains one species, K. wilsoni.

External links
 Kawina at the Paleobiology Database

Cheiruridae
Silurian trilobites
Prehistoric life of Europe
Paleozoic life of Newfoundland and Labrador
Paleozoic life of the Northwest Territories
Paleozoic life of Quebec
Paleozoic life of Yukon
Phacopida genera